Murray Gell-Mann (September 15, 1929 – May 24, 2019) was an American physicist who received the 1969 Nobel Prize in Physics for his work on the theory of elementary particles. He was the Robert Andrews Millikan Professor of Theoretical Physics Emeritus at the California Institute of Technology, a distinguished fellow and one of the co-founders of the Santa Fe Institute, a professor of physics at the University of New Mexico, and the Presidential Professor of Physics and Medicine at the University of Southern California.

Gell-Mann spent several periods at CERN, a nuclear research facility in Switzerland, among others as a John Simon Guggenheim Memorial Foundation fellow in 1972.

Early life and education
Gell-Mann was born in Lower Manhattan to a family of Jewish immigrants from the Austro-Hungarian Empire, specifically from Czernowitz in present-day Ukraine. His parents were Pauline (née Reichstein) and Arthur Isidore Gell-Mann, who taught English as a second language.

Propelled by an intense boyhood curiosity and love for nature and mathematics, he graduated valedictorian from the Columbia Grammar & Preparatory School aged 14 and subsequently entered Yale College as a member of Jonathan Edwards College. At Yale, he participated in the William Lowell Putnam Mathematical Competition and was on the team representing Yale University (along with Murray Gerstenhaber and Henry O. Pollak) that won the second prize in 1947.

Gell-Mann graduated from Yale with a bachelor's degree in physics in 1948 and intended to pursue graduate studies in physics. He sought to remain in the Ivy League for his graduate education and applied to Princeton University as well as Harvard University. He was rejected by Princeton and accepted by Harvard, but the latter institution was unable to offer him any of the financial assistance that he needed. He was accepted by the Massachusetts Institute of Technology (MIT) and received a letter from Victor Weisskopf urging him to attend MIT and become Weisskopf's research assistant, which would provide Gell-Mann with the financial assistance he needed. Unaware of MIT's eminent status in physics research, Gell-Mann was "miserable" with the fact that he would not be able to attend Princeton or Harvard and considered suicide. He stated that he realized he could try to first enter MIT and commit suicide afterwards if he found it to be truly terrible. However, he couldn't first choose suicide and then attend MIT; the two "didn't commute", as Gell-Mann said.

Gell-Mann received his Ph.D. in physics from MIT in 1951 after completing a doctoral dissertation, titled "Coupling strength and nuclear reactions", under the supervision of Victor Weisskopf.

Career
Gell-Mann was a postdoctoral fellow at the Institute for Advanced Study in 1951, and a visiting research professor at the University of Illinois at Urbana–Champaign from 1952 to 1953. He was a visiting associate professor at Columbia University and an associate professor at the University of Chicago in 1954–1955 before moving to the California Institute of Technology, where he taught from 1955 until he retired in 1993.

Nuclear physics
In 1958, Gell-Mann in collaboration with Richard Feynman, in parallel with the independent team of E. C. George Sudarshan and Robert Marshak, discovered the chiral structures of the weak interaction of physics and developed the V-A theory (vector minus axial vector theory). This work followed the experimental discovery of the violation of parity by Chien-Shiung Wu, as suggested by Chen-Ning Yang and Tsung-Dao Lee, theoretically.

Gell-Mann's work in the 1950s involved recently discovered cosmic ray particles that came to be called kaons and hyperons. Classifying these particles led him to propose that a quantum number called strangeness would be conserved by the strong and the electromagnetic interactions, but not by the weak interactions. (Kazuhiko Nishijima arrived at this idea independently, calling the quantity -charge after the eta meson.) Another of Gell-Mann's ideas is the Gell-Mann–Okubo formula, which was, initially, a formula based on empirical results, but was later explained by his quark model. Gell-Mann and Abraham Pais were involved in explaining the puzzling aspect of the neutral kaon mixing.

Murray Gell-Mann's fortunate encounter with mathematician Richard Earl Block at Caltech, in the fall of 1960, "enlightened" him to introduce a novel classification scheme, in 1961, for hadrons. A similar scheme had been independently proposed by Yuval Ne'eman, and is now explained by the quark model. Gell-Mann referred to the scheme as the eightfold way, because of the octets of particles in the classification (the term is a reference to the Eightfold Path of Buddhism).

Gell-Mann, along with Maurice Lévy, developed the sigma model of pions, which describes low-energy pion interactions.

In 1964, Gell-Mann and, independently, George Zweig went on to postulate the existence of quarks, particles of which the hadrons of this scheme are composed. The name was coined by Gell-Mann and is a reference to the novel Finnegans Wake, by James Joyce ("Three quarks for Muster Mark!" book 2, episode 4). Zweig had referred to the particles as "aces", but Gell-Mann's name caught on. Quarks, antiquarks, and gluons were soon established as the underlying elementary objects in the study of the structure of hadrons. He was awarded a Nobel Prize in Physics in 1969 for his contributions and discoveries concerning the classification of elementary particles and their interactions.

In the 1960s, he introduced current algebra as a method of systematically exploiting symmetries to extract predictions from quark models, in the absence of reliable dynamical theory. This method led to model-independent sum rules confirmed by experiment and provided starting points underpinning the development of the Standard Model (SM), the widely accepted theory of elementary particles.

In 1972 he and Harald Fritzsch introduced the conserved quantum number "color charge", and later, together with Heinrich Leutwyler, they coined the term quantum chromodynamics (QCD) as the gauge theory of the strong interaction. The quark model is a part of QCD, and it has been robust enough to accommodate in a natural fashion the discovery of new "flavors" of quarks, which superseded the eightfold way scheme.

Gell-Mann was responsible, together with Pierre Ramond and Richard Slansky, and independently of Peter Minkowski, Rabindra Mohapatra, Goran Senjanović, Sheldon Glashow, and Tsutomu Yanagida, for the seesaw theory of neutrino masses, that produces masses at the large scale in any theory with a right-handed neutrino. He is also known to have played a role in keeping string theory alive through the 1970s and early 1980s, supporting that line of research at a time when it was a topic of niche interest.

Complexity science and popular writing
At the time of his death, Gell-Mann was the Robert Andrews Millikan Professor of Theoretical Physics Emeritus at California Institute of Technology as well as a University Professor in the Physics and Astronomy Department of the University of New Mexico in Albuquerque, New Mexico, and the Presidential Professor of Physics and Medicine at the University of Southern California. He was a member of the editorial board of the Encyclopædia Britannica. In 1984 Gell-Mann was one of several co-founders of the Santa Fe Institute—a non-profit theoretical research institute in Santa Fe, New Mexico intended to study various aspects of a complex system and disseminate the notion of a separate interdisciplinary study of complexity theory.

He wrote a popular science book about physics and complexity science, The Quark and the Jaguar: Adventures in the Simple and the Complex (1994). The title of the book is taken from a line of a poem by Arthur Sze: "The world of the quark has everything to do with a jaguar circling in the night".

The author George Johnson has written a biography of Gell-Mann, Strange Beauty: Murray Gell-Mann, and the Revolution in 20th-Century Physics (1999), which was shortlisted for the Royal Society Book Prize. Gell-Mann himself criticized Strange Beauty for some inaccuracies, with one interviewer reporting him wincing at the mention of it. In a review in the Caltech magazine Engineering & Science, Gell-Mann's colleague, the physicist David Goodstein, wrote: "I don't envy Murray the weird experience of reading so penetrating and perceptive a biography of himself. . . George Johnson has written a fine biography of this important and complex man". Physicist and Nobel laureate Philip Anderson, called the book "a masterpiece of scientific explication for the layman" and a "must read" in a review for the Times Higher Education Supplement and in his chapter on Gell-Mann from a 2011 book. Sheldon Glashow, another Nobel laureate, gave Strange Beauty a generally positive review while noting some inaccuracies, and physicist and science historian Silvan S. Schweber called the book "an elegant biography of one of the outstanding theorists of the twentieth century" though he noted that Johnson did not go into depth about Gell-Mann's work with military–industrial organizations like the Institute for Defense Analyses. Johnson has written that Gell-Mann was a perfectionist and that The Quark and the Jaguar was consequently submitted late and incomplete. In an item on Edge.org, Johnson described the back story of his relationship with Gell-Mann and noted that an errata sheet appears on the biography's webpage. Gell-Mann's one-time Caltech associate Stephen Wolfram called Johnson's book "a very good biography of Murray, which Murray hated".  Wolfram also wrote that Gell-Mann thought the writing of The Quark and the Jaguar to be responsible for a heart attack he (Gell-Mann) had had.
 
In 2012 Gell-Mann and his companion Mary McFadden published the book Mary McFadden: A Lifetime of Design, Collecting, and Adventure.

Quantum foundations
Gell-Mann was a proponent of the consistent histories approach to understanding quantum mechanics, which he advocated in papers with James Hartle.

Personal life
Gell-Mann married J. Margaret Dow in 1955; they had a daughter and a son. Margaret died in 1981, and in 1992 he married Marcia Southwick, whose son became his stepson.

Gell-Mann's interests outside of physics included archaeology, numismatics, birdwatching and linguistics. Along with S. A. Starostin, he established the Evolution of Human Languages project at the Santa Fe Institute. As a humanist and an agnostic, Gell-Mann was a Humanist Laureate in the International Academy of Humanism. Novelist Cormac McCarthy saw Gell-Mann as a polymath who "knew more things about more things than anyone I've ever met...losing Murray is like losing the Encyclopædia Britannica."

Gell-Mann died on May 24, 2019, at his home in Santa Fe, New Mexico.

Awards and honors

Gell-Mann won numerous awards and honours including the following:

 1959 – Dannie Heineman Prize for Mathematical Physics
 1960 – Elected member of the National Academy of Sciences
 1962 – American Academy of Achievement's Golden Plate Award 
 1964 – Elected member of the American Academy of Arts and Sciences
 1966 – Ernest Orlando Lawrence Award
 1967 – Franklin Medal
 1968 – National Academy of Sciences – John J. Carty Award
 1969 – Research Corporation Award 
 1969 – Nobel Prize in Physics 
 1978 – Elected a Foreign Member of the Royal Society (ForMemRS)
 1988 – United Nations Environment Programme Roll of Honor for Environmental Achievement (The Global 500) 
 1993 – Elected member of The American Philosophical Society
 2005 – Albert Einstein Medal
 2005 – American Humanist Association – Humanist of the Year 
 2014 – Helmholtz-Medal of the Berlin-Brandenburg Academy of Sciences and Humanities 

Universities that gave Gell-Mann honorary doctorates include Cambridge, Columbia, the University of Chicago, Oxford and Yale.

See also
 Complex adaptive system
 Gell-Mann amnesia effect (Michael Crichton's perspective on inaccuracy in the media, which he named for Murray Gell-Mann)
 Kaon
 Non-linear sigma model
 Omega baryon
 Pseudoscalar meson
 Random phase approximation

References

Further reading
 Encyclopædia Britannica biography of Murray Gell-Mann
 
 
 Murray Gell-Mann tells his life story at Web of Stories
 
 The Making of a Physicist: A Talk With Murray Gell-Mann
 
 The Man With Five Brains
 The Simple and the Complex, Part I: The Quantum and the Quasi-Classical with Murray Gell-Mann, Ph.D.

External links

 
 
 "Beauty, truth and ... physics?" (TED2007)
 "The ancestor of language" (TED2007)
 Murray Gell-Mann Video Interview with the Academy of Achievement in 1990
 Murray Gell-Mann talks quarks (Video)
 Membership at the Council on Foreign Relations
 

1929 births
2019 deaths
Nobel laureates in Physics
American Nobel laureates
Albert Einstein Medal recipients
American agnostics
American humanists
American people of Austrian-Jewish descent
American people of Romanian-Jewish descent
21st-century American physicists
Jewish American physicists
California Institute of Technology faculty
Complex systems scientists
Fellows of Pakistan Academy of Sciences
Fellows of the American Physical Society
Institute for Advanced Study visiting scholars
Columbia University faculty
Foreign Members of the Royal Society
Foreign Members of the Russian Academy of Sciences
Foreign Fellows of the Indian National Science Academy
Jewish agnostics
Jewish humanists
Members of the United States National Academy of Sciences
Particle physicists
People from Manhattan
People from Santa Fe, New Mexico
American systems scientists
Theoretical physicists
Wesleyan University people
Yale College alumni
Members of JASON (advisory group)
People associated with CERN
Santa Fe Institute people
Scientists from New York City
Fellows of the American Academy of Arts and Sciences
Columbia Grammar & Preparatory School alumni
MIT Department of Physics alumni
Long-range comparative linguists
University of New Mexico faculty
Members of the American Philosophical Society